Leandro Sosa may refer to:
 Leandro Sosa (footballer, born 1994), Uruguayan footballer for O'Higgins
 Leandro Sosa (footballer, born 1991), Uruguayan footballer for Aldosivi